Good as Gold is a 1979 novel, written by Joseph Heller and illustrated by Paul Bacon.

Plot
Bruce Gold, a Jewish, middle-aged university English professor and author of many unread, seminal articles in small journals, residing in Manhattan, is offered the chance for success, fame and fortune in Washington D.C. as the country's first ever Jewish Secretary of State. But he must face the consequences of this, such as divorcing his wife and alienating his family, the thought of which energizes him and makes him cringe at the same time.

Literary significance and criticism

The novel is well regarded by both fans of Heller and literary critics, being viewed as a return to the gag and verbal play that Heller established in Catch-22 and abandoned in favor of the scathing sarcasm and the darker story in Something Happened. Good as Gold functions as a satire on the U.S. government, in a manner similar to the satirization of the army in Catch-22 and the corporation in Something Happened.

Gore Vidal listed Good as Gold as one of his five favorite post-World War II novels, describing it as Heller "at his deadly best, illuminating a hustler on the make in politics".

References

1979 American novels
American comedy novels
Novels by Joseph Heller
Novels set in Washington, D.C.
Simon & Schuster books
Books with cover art by Paul Bacon